|}

The Irish Mirror Novice Hurdle is a Grade 1 National Hunt hurdle race in Ireland which is open to horses aged four years or older. It is run at Punchestown over a distance of about 3 miles (4,828 metres), and during its running there are fourteen hurdles to be jumped. The race is for novice hurdlers, and it is scheduled to take place each year during the Punchestown Festival in late April or early May. 

The race has risen rapidly in status, firstly to Grade 3 in 2009, to Grade 2 the following year and finally to Grade 1 in 2011.

Records
Leading jockey (5 wins):
 Paul Townend -  Marasonnien (2012), Killultagh Vic (2015), Next Destination (2018), Galopin Des Champs (2021), The Nice Guy (2022)

Leading trainer (7 wins):
 Willie Mullins - The Midnight Club (2009), Marasonnien (2012), Killultagh Vic (2015), Bellshill (2016), Next Destination (2018), Galopin Des Champs (2021), The Nice Guy (2022)

Winners since 2005

See also 
 Horse racing in Ireland
 List of Irish National Hunt races

References 
Racing Post:

Punchestown Racecourse
National Hunt races in Ireland
National Hunt hurdle races